Dimensions CM is a software change and configuration management product developed by Micro Focus. It includes revision control, change, build and release management capabilities.

Since 2014 (v14.1) Dimensions CM includes PulseUno module providing Code review and Continuous integration capabilities. Starting with the version 14.5.2 (2020) it can also serve as a binary repository manager.

History
Previous product names:
 PCMS Dimensions (SQL Software) 
 PVCS Dimensions (Merant, Intersolv)

See also
List of revision control software
Comparison of revision control software

References

Proprietary version control systems
Configuration management
Programming tools
Micro Focus International